Wuzhishan (literally five point mountain) is a county-level city in the highlands of Hainan  island, China. Although called a "city", Wuzhishan refers to a large land area in Hainan - an area which was once a county. Within this area is the main city seat located beside Wuzhi mountain called Wuzhishan City. The city's total area is 1129 square kilometres, and its population is 115,000 people. Its postal code is 572200, and its district number is 0898.

Climate

References

Cities in Hainan
County-level divisions of Hainan